Manalo is a Tagalog-language surname meaning "to win". It may also be a rare Catalan surname as Manaló, derived from a variant of Maneló, which is a pet form of the personal name Manel and a short form of Emanuel. Notable people with the surname include:

Iglesia ni Cristo
Felix Manalo (1886–1963), founder of the Iglesia ni Cristo organization, Executive Minister from 1914 to 1963
Eraño G. Manalo (1925–2009), Executive Minister of the Iglesia ni Cristo from 1963 to 2009
 Angel Manalo, son of Eraño Manalo, involved in 2015 Iglesia ni Cristo leadership controversy
 Tenny Manalo (born 1937), widow of Eraño Manalo, involved in 2015 Iglesia ni Cristo leadership controversy
Eduardo V. Manalo (born 1955), current Executive Minister of the Iglesia ni Cristo

Others with the surname 
 Bianca Manalo (born 1987), Filipina actress and 2009 Binibining Pilipinas-Universe winner
Enrique Manalo (1952) Ambassador of the Philippines 
 Jay Manalo (born 1973), Filipino actor
Jesulito (Jess) Manalo, Lawyer, Ambassador and House Representative for ANGKLA
 John Manalo (born 1995), Filipino actor
 Jose Manalo (born 1966), Filipino actor and comedian
Juslyn Manalo, Daly City, California’s first Filipina-American mayor
 Marlon Manalo (born 1975), Filipino pool player
 Nichole Manalo, Filipina actress and 2009 Binibining Pilipinas-Globe winner
Rosario Manalo (born 1935) Ambassador of the Philippines and Academic
 Victoria Manalo Draves (born 1924), American competition diver

See also
Manolo
Menalo

References

Tagalog-language surnames
Catalan-language surnames